Osøyro is the administrative centre of Bjørnafjorden municipality in Vestland county, Norway. The European route E39 highway runs through the village on its way to Bergen. There is a car ferry from the east side of Osøyro to the village of Fusa, across the Fusafjorden. Os Church is located in the village.

Osøyro has several smaller suburban villages surrounding it: Søfteland to the north, Søvik to the northwest, Hagavik to the west, Søre Øyane to the southwest, and Halhjem to the south.

References

Villages in Vestland
Bjørnafjorden